This list of protected areas of Ohio includes national forest lands, Army Corps of Engineers areas, state parks, state forests, state nature preserves, state wildlife management areas, and other areas.

Federal lands

National Park Service, Department of the Interior
Cuyahoga Valley National Park
Hopewell Culture National Historical Park

U.S. Forest Service, Department of Agriculture
Wayne National Forest

U.S. Fish and Wildlife Service, Department of the Interior
 Ottawa National Wildlife Refuge Complex
 Cedar Point National Wildlife Refuge
 Ottawa National Wildlife Refuge
 West Sister Island National Wildlife Refuge

Army Corps of Engineers, Department of Defense
Belleville Locks and Dam
Caesar Creek Dam (at Caesar Creek State Park)
Tom Jenkins Dam (at Burr Oak State Park)

State lands

State parks

State memorials 
Adena State Memorial
Buckeye Furnace State Memorial
Campbell Mound State Memorial
Flint Ridge State Memorial
Friends Meeting House State Memorial
Fort Ancient State Memorial, Warren County
Fort Hill State Memorial
Glendower State Memorial, Warren County
Leo Petroglyph State Memorial
Miamisburg Mound State Memorial, Montgomery County
Serpent Mound State Memorial
Tarleton Cross Mound State Memorial

State forests 

Blue Rock State Forest - 4,572 acres (19 km2)
Brush Creek State Forest - ca. 12,000 acres (49 km2)
Dean State Forest - 2,745 acres (10 km2)
Fernwood State Forest - 2,107 acres (9 km2)
Gifford State Forest - 320 acres (1.3 km2); Athens County
Harrison State Forest - 1,345 acres (5 km2)
Hocking State Forest - 9,374 acres (38 km2)
Maumee State Forest - 3,068 acres (12 km2)
Mohican-Memorial State Forest - 4,192 acres (17 km2); Ashland County
Perry State Forest - 4,567 acres (18 km2); Perry County
Pike State Forest - 11,621 acres (47 km2)
Richland Furnace State Forest - 2,343 acres (9 km2)
Scioto Trail State Forest - 9,371 acres (38 km2)
Shade River State Forest - 2,601 acres (11 km2); Meigs County
Shawnee State Forest - 59,603 acres (241 km2); Scioto and Adams Counties
Sunfish Creek State Forest - 637 acres (2.6 km2)
Tar Hollow State Forest - 16,126 acres (65 km2)
Vinton Furnace State Experimental Forest - 
Waterloo State Forest (administered by Zaleski State Forest); Athens County
Yellow Creek State Forest - 756 acres (3.1 km2)
Zaleski State Forest - 26,313 acres (107 km2); Athens and Vinton Counties

State wildlife management areas 
Fox Lake Wildlife Management Area (Athens County)
Highlandtown Wildlife Area (Columbiana County, Washington Township)
Milan State Wildlife Area
Sunday Creek Wildlife Management Area (Athens County)
Tiffin River Wildlife Area (Fulton County)
Trimble Wildlife Management Area (Athens County)
Turkey Ridge Wildlife Area (Vinton County)
Waterloo Wildlife Research Station (Athens County)
Wolf Creek Wildlife Management Area (Morgan County)

State nature preserves 
 Acadia Cliffs State Nature Preserve
 Adams Lake Prairie State Nature Preserve
 Audubon Islands State Nature Preserve
 Aurora Sanctuary State Nature Preserve
 Baker Woods State Nature Preserve
 Bigelow Cemetery Prairie State Nature Preserve
 Blackhand Gorge State Nature Preserve
 Boord State Nature Preserve
 Brown's Lake Bog State Nature Preserve
 Burton Wetlands State Nature Preserve
 Caesar Creek Gorge State Nature Preserve
 Carmean Woods State Nature Preserve
 Cedar Bog State Nature Preserve
 Chaparral Prairie State Nature Preserve
 Clear Creek State Nature Preserve
 Clear Fork Gorge State Nature Preserve
 Clifton Gorge State Nature Preserve
 Collier State Nature Preserve
 Compass Plant Prairie State Nature Preserve
 Conkle's Hollow State Nature Preserve
 Conneaut Swamp State Nature Preserve
 Cranberry Bog State Nature Preserve
 Crooked Run State Nature Preserve
 Culberson Woods State Nature Preserve
 Davey Woods State Nature Preserve
 Davis Memorial State Nature Preserve
 Drew Woods State Nature Preserve
 Dupont Marsh State Nature Preserve
 Eagle Creek State Nature Preserve
 Erie Sand Barrens State Nature Preserve
 Fowler Woods State Nature Preserve
 Gahanna Woods State Nature Preserve
 Goll Woods State Nature Preserve
 Goode Prairie State Nature Preserve
 Greenville Falls State Nature Preserve
 Gross Woods State Nature Preserve
 Hach-Otis State Nature Preserve
 Halls Creek Woods State Nature Preserve
 Headlands Dunes State Nature Preserve
 Herrick Fen State Nature Preserve
 Hueston Woods State Nature Preserve
 Hutchins (Highbanks) State Nature Preserve
 Irwin Prairie State Nature Preserve
 Jackson Bog State Nature Preserve
 Johnson Ridge State Nature Preserve
 Johnson Woods State Nature Preserve
 Kendrick Woods State Nature Preserve
 Kent (Cooperrider) Bog State Nature Preserve
 Kessler Swamp State Nature Preserve
 Kiser Lake Wetlands State Nature Preserve
 Kitty Todd State Nature Preserve
 Knox Woods State Nature Preserve
 Kyle Woods State Nature Preserve
 Lake Katharine State Nature Preserve
 Lakeside Daisy State Nature Preserve
 Lawrence Woods State Nature Preserve
 Lou Campbell State Nature Preserve
 Mantua Bog State Nature Preserve
 Marie J. Desonier State Nature Preserve
 Marsh Wetlands State Nature Preserve
 Mentor Marsh State Nature Preserve
 Milford Center Prairie State Nature Preserve
 Morris Woods State Nature Preserve
 North Pond State Nature Preserve
 North Shore Alvar State Nature Preserve
 Novak State Nature Preserve
 Old Woman Creek State Nature Preserve
 Olsen (Augusta-Anne) State Nature Preserve
 Pickerington Ponds State Nature Preserve
 Portage Lakes Wetland State Nature Preserve
 Riddle State Nature Preserve
 Rockbridge State Nature Preserve
 Sears Woods State Nature Preserve
 Seymour Woods State Nature Preserve
 Shallenberger State Nature Preserve
 Sharon Woods Gorge State Nature Preserve
 Sheepskin Hollow State Nature Preserve
 Sheldon Marsh State Nature Preserve
 Shoemaker State Nature Preserve
 Siegenthaler-Kaestner Esker State Nature Preserve
 Smith Cemetery Prairie State Nature Preserve
 Springville Marsh State Nature Preserve
 Stage's Pond State Nature Preserve
 Stratford Woods State Nature Preserve
 Swamp Cottonwood State Nature Preserve
 Thomas (Sharon Woods) State Nature Preserve
 Tinker's Creek State Nature Preserve
 Triangle Lake Bog State Nature Preserve
 Tucker (Blacklick) State Nature Preserve
 Tummonds State Nature Preserve
 Wahkeena State Nature Preserve
 Whipple State Nature Preserve
 Zimmerman Prairie State Nature Preserve

Metroparks 

A number of regional park districts have been organized in Ohio:
 Cleveland Metroparks 
 Columbus and Franklin County Metropolitan Park District 
 Erie MetroParks 
 Five Rivers Metroparks (Dayton) 
 Geauga County Park District 
 Johnny Appleseed Metropolitan Park District 
 Lake Metroparks 
Stark County Park District
Tuscarawas County Park Department
 Lorain County Metro Parks 
 Metro Parks, Serving Summit County 
 Metroparks of Butler County 
 Metroparks of the Toledo Area 
 Mill Creek MetroParks 
 Great Parks of Hamilton County

Other significant local areas 
 Arc of Appalachia
 Athens Conservancy preserves, in Athens County, Ohio
 Crane Hollow Nature Preserve, Hocking County, Ohio
 Highlands Sanctuary, centered in Highland County, Ohio
 Moonville Rail-Trail, a rail-trail in Athens and Vinton Counties
 Strouds Ridge Preserve, City of Athens, Ohio
 Trimble Community Forest in Athens County, Ohio
 The Wilds (Muskingum County, Ohio)

References
Art Weber.  Ohio State Parks.  Saginaw, Michigan:  Glovebox Guidebooks, 1995.  .

External links

Ohio State Parks
List of parks

 
 
 
Protected areas
Ohio